The Super Match is an annual and bi-annual pre-season friendly tournament. The tournament was previously referred to as Thomas Cook Trophy until 2008, Ferrostaal Cup in 2010, Winoly Cup in 2012, and Super Match by Carlsberg, due to sponsorship. Manchester City are the hosts of the competition. The game is usually the last before the Premier League opening match and features a highly reputed UEFA club.

Manchester City have played against UEFA Champions League sides Arsenal, Borussia Dortmund, Lazio, Milan, Olympiacos, Porto, VfB Stuttgart, and Valencia in previous editions of the competition.

Super Matches which do not involve Manchester City are known as SuperGames and are played in Gothenburg, Sweden.

Year-by-year

2004 Thomas Cook Trophy

2005 Thomas Cook Trophy

2006 Thomas Cook Trophy

2007 Thomas Cook Trophy

2008 Thomas Cook Trophy

2010 Ferrostaal Cup

2012 Winoly Cup

2013 Super Match by Carlsberg

2015 Super Match

2016 Super Match

2017 Super Match

Tournament winners

Participating teams 

Bold indicates the participating team won the tournament that year.

Sponsorship
The inaugural sponsor of the cup was travel agent Thomas Cook. In 2010, sponsorship of the competition moved to Ferrostaal, who had signed a representative deal with Manchester City. In 2012, the tournament again changed sponsors, this time to sports company "Winoly". In 2013, it was announced that Winoly had moved its sponsorship to a rival competition. On 5 June 2013, Danish Alcoholic beverage company Carlsberg took over sponsorship of the event, then known as the Super Match by Carlsberg. In 2015, there was no title sponsor for the competition.

References 

English football friendly trophies
Manchester City F.C.
2004 establishments in England
Recurring sporting events established in 2004
Sports competitions in Manchester
Sports competitions in Dortmund
Football in Beijing
Sports competitions in Helsinki
Sports competitions in Stuttgart
Sports competitions in Beijing